The Kingdom of Belgin, also known as the Kingdom of Baqulin, was an early medieval kingdom centered in Northeast Africa. According to Al-Yaqubi, it was one of six Beja polities that existed in the region during the 9th century. The kingdom's territory was located between Aswan and Massawa.

See also
Sultanate of Ifat
Adal Sultanate
Kingdom of Bazin
Kingdom of Jarin
Kingdom of Nagash
Kingdom of Qita'a
Kingdom of Tankish

Notes

History of Africa
Former sultanates in the medieval Horn of Africa